Sofia Bohdanowicz is a Canadian filmmaker. She is known for her collaborations with Deragh Campbell and made her feature film directorial debut in 2016 with Never Eat Alone. Her second feature film, Maison du Bonheur, was a finalist for the Rogers Best Canadian Film Award at the 2018 Toronto Film Critics Association Awards. That year, she won the Jay Scott Prize from the Toronto Film Critics Association. Her third feature film, MS Slavic 7, which she co-directed with Campbell, had its world premiere at the 69th Berlin International Film Festival in 2019. She has also directed several short films, such as Veslemøy's Song (2018) and Point and Line to Plane (2020).

Career 
After directing several short films since 2009, Bohdanowicz made her feature film directorial debut in 2016 with Never Eat Alone. The film follows a lonely grandmother as she tries to reconnect with an ex-boyfriend from her youth. After premiering at the Vancouver International Film Festival, it screened at the Buenos Aires International Festival of Independent Cinema as part of a 2017 retrospective of Bohdanowicz's work.
Her second feature film, Maison du Bonheur, which profiles 77-year-old Juliane Sellam, a French astrologer living in Montmartre, was a finalist for the Rogers Best Canadian Film Award at the Toronto Film Critics Association Awards 2018. The film premiered at the Buenos Aires International Festival of Independent Cinema on April 23, 2017, and had a limited theatrical release in the U.S. and Canada in 2018. The Globe and Mail's Barry Hertz named the film one of his top 10 films of 2018, writing "A supremely thoughtful and careful study of one elderly Parisian woman, Maison du bonheur is as revealing as it is honest and sincere," adding, "This is a film to seek out and cherish.” Glenn Kenny of The New York Times selected the film as a Critics' Pick and called it "a profound delight."

Her collaborations with actress Deragh Campbell have screened at festivals around the world. Since 2016, Campbell has portrayed the character of Audrey Benac in four of Bohdanowicz's films—Never Eat Alone, Veslemøy's Song (2018), and MS Slavic 7 (2019), the latter of which Campbell co-directed. Never Eat Alone premiered in the Future//Present section of the 2016 Vancouver International Film Festival; Veslemøy's Song, a short film, premiered at the 2018 Locarno Film Festival and was named by the Toronto International Film Festival to its annual year-end Canada's Top Ten list; MS Slavic 7 had its world premiere at the 69th Berlin International Film Festival and screened at the annual New Directors/New Films Festival.

Her latest short film, Point and Line to Plane, which also featured Campbell as the fictional character Audrey Benac, premiered at the Marseille International Film Festival in July 2020 and subsequently screened at the Toronto International Film Festival, the New York Film Festival, the Festival de nouveau cinéma in Montreal, and the Vienna International Film Festival, among others.

In a 2020 interview with film website Seventh Row, Bohdanowicz revealed that despite directing and editing several feature films, she has never written a screenplay. That year, she also directed a short documentary film titled The Hardest Working Cat in Show Biz, which was released online by Filmmaker.

In 2021, she was one of the participants in John Greyson's experimental short documentary film International Dawn Chorus Day.

Accolades 
Bohdanowicz has won accolades for her work. In 2016, at the Vancouver International Film Festival, Bohdanowicz won the Emerging Canadian Director award for Never Eat Alone. At the 17th Vancouver Film Critics Circle Awards, she was nominated for Best Director of a Canadian Film and won the award for Best Canadian Documentary. In 2018, she was awarded the Jay Scott Prize by the Toronto Film Critics Association.

Filmography

References

External links

Canadian women film directors
Canadian documentary film directors
Film directors from Toronto
Living people
Year of birth missing (living people)
Canadian women documentary filmmakers